Indian Banks is a historic home and archaeological site located near Simonson, Richmond County, Virginia. It was built in 1699, and is a two-story, five-bay, Colonial era brick dwelling with a hipped roof and interior end chimneys.  The front facade features bricks that are molded or carved into a wavy pattern. A one-story wing was added in 1975.  The original Indian Banks was built in 1699 on the site of a Moraughtacund Indian village visited by Captain John Smith (1580–1631), in 1608, but the name, Indian Banks, was not recorded until 1822.

It was added to the National Register of Historic Places in 1980.

References

External links
Indian Banks, State Route 606, Tidewater, Richmond, VA: 7 photos and 2 data pages at Historic American Buildings Survey

Historic American Buildings Survey in Virginia
Houses on the National Register of Historic Places in Virginia
Houses completed in 1728
Colonial architecture in Virginia
Houses in Richmond County, Virginia
National Register of Historic Places in Richmond County, Virginia
1728 establishments in Virginia